Kristjan Kombe (born 28 March 2000) is an Estonian professional ice hockey centre who currently plays for Kiekko-Vantaa in the Mestis on loan from Jokerit of the Kontinental Hockey League (KHL).

Career statistics

Regular season and playoffs

International statistics

References

External links
 

2000 births
Living people
Sportspeople from Kuressaare
Estonian ice hockey centres
HPK players
Jokerit players
Kiekko-Vantaa players
Estonian expatriate sportspeople in Finland
Estonian expatriate ice hockey people
Expatriate ice hockey players in Finland